Astragalus didymocarpus is a species of milkvetch known by the common names Dwarf white milkvetch and Two-seeded milkvetch. It is native to the southwestern United States and northern Mexico, where it can be found in many types of habitat.

Description
The inflorescence is covered in long black and white hairs.

The fruit is a small, spherical legume pod which dries to a stiff papery texture.

Varieties
There are several varieties of Astragalus didymocarpus:
A. d. var. didymocarpus - erect herb found in western Nevada and much of California
A. d. var. dispermus - prostrate form native to the desert regions
A. d. var. milesianus (Miles' milkvetch) - rare variety found only along the Central Coast of California
A. d. var. obispoensis - form with ascending stems native to coastal southern California and Baja California

References

External links
Jepson Manual Treatment - Astragalus didymocarpus
USDA Plants Profile: Astragalus didymocarpus
Photo gallery: Astragalus didymocarpus var. didymocarpus

didymocarpus
Flora of Northwestern Mexico
Flora of the Southwestern United States
Flora of the California desert regions
Flora of the Sonoran Deserts
Flora of California
Natural history of the Central Valley (California)